Borjelu (also Romanized as Borjelū) is a village in Yaft Rural District, Moradlu District, Meshgin Shahr County, Ardabil Province, Iran. At the 2006 census, its population was 200, in 43 families.

References 

Towns and villages in Meshgin Shahr County